Allomyces arbusculus is a species of fungus from India. It has contributed to studies in biochemistry.

References

Aquatic fungi
Fungi described in 1911
Fungi of India
Blastocladiomycota